Brock is a given name.

Notable people with the given name "Brock" include

A
Brock Adams (1927–2004), American politician
Brock Anderson (born 1997), American professional wrestler
Brock Aynsley (born 1950), Canadian football player

B
Brock Berlin (born 1981), American football player
Brock Berryhill (born 1984), American songwriter
Brock Bierman, American civil servant
Brock Blake, American entrepreneur
Brock Blomberg (born 1967), American economist
Brock Boeser (born 1997), American ice hockey player
Brock Bolen (born 1985), American football player
Brock Bond (born 1985), American baseball player
Brock Bowers (born 2002), American football player
Brock Boyle (born 1982), Canadian lacrosse player
Brock Norman Brock (born 1966), British screenwriter
Brock Brower (1931–2014), American novelist
Brock Burke (born 1996), American football player

C
Brock Chisholm (1896–1971), Canadian psychiatrist
Brock Cole (born 1938), American author
Brock Coyle (born 1990), American football player

D
Brock Davis (born 1943), American baseball player
Brock Duckworth (born 1989), American soccer player
Brock Dykxhoorn (born 1994), Canadian baseball player

E
Brock Elbank, English photographer
Brock Enright (born 1976), American artist

F
Brock Faber (born 2002), American ice hockey player
Brock Forsey (born 1980), American football player

G
Brock Gill (born 1975), American stunt artist
Brock Gillespie (born 1983), American basketball player
Brock Granger (born 1991), American soccer player
Brock Greenfield (born 1975), American politician
Brock Gutierrez (born 1973), American football player

H
Brock Harris (born 1988), American model
Brock Hekking (born 1991), American football player
Brock Hoffman (born 1999), American football player
Brock Holt (born 1988), American baseball player
Brock Huard (born 1976), American football player
Brock Huntzinger (born 1988), American baseball player

I
Brock Ingram (born 1977), Australian Paralympic kayaker and rower

J
Brock Jackley (born 1947), American politician
Brock James (born 1981), Australian rugby union footballer
Brock Jensen (born 1990), American football player
Brock Jones (born 2001), American baseball player

K
Brock Kjeldgaard (born 1986), Canadian baseball player
Brock Kreitzburg (born 1976), American bobsledder

L
Brock Lamb (born 1997), Australian rugby league footballer
Brock Larson (born 1977), American mixed martial artist 
Brock Lesnar (born 1977), American professional wrestler
Brock Long (born 1975), American civil servant

M
Brock Marion (born 1970), American football player
Brock Matheson (born 1987), Canadian ice hockey player
Brock McElheran (1918–2008), Canadian conductor
Brock McGillis (born 1983), Canadian ice hockey player
Brock McGinn (born 1994), Canadian ice hockey player
Brock McLean (born 1986), Australian rules footballer
Brock McPherson (born 1985), Canadian ice hockey player
Brock Meeks (born 1956), American journalist
Brock Miron (born 1980), Canadian speed skater
Brock Motum (born 1990), Australian basketball player
Brock Mueller (born 1978), Australian rugby league footballer

N
Brock Nelson (born 1991), American ice hockey player

O
Brock O'Brien (born 1988), Australian rules footballer
Brock O'Hurn (born 1991), American model
Brock Olivo (born 1976), American football player
Brock Osweiler (born 1990), American football player

P
Brock Parker (born 1981), American poker player
Brock Pemberton (1885–1950), American theatre director
Brock Pemberton (baseball) (1953–2016), American baseball player
Brock Peters (1927–2005), American actor
Brock Peterson (born 1983), American baseball player
Brock Pierce (born 1980), American entrepreneur
Brock Porter (born 2003), American baseball player
Brock Purdy (born 1999), American football player

R
Brock Radunske (born 1983), Canadian-South Korean ice hockey player
Brock Ralph (born 1980), Canadian football player

S
Brock Spack (born 1962), American football coach
Brock Speer (1920–1999), American singer
Brock Staller (born 1992), Canadian rugby union footballer
Brock Stassi (born 1989), American football player
Brock Stewart (born 1991), American baseball player
Brock Strom (born 1934), American football player
Brock Sunderland (born 1979), American football player

T
Brock Tessman (born 1976), American academic
Brock Thompson (born 1980), American businessman & marketer
Brock Tredway (born 1959), Canadian ice hockey player
Brock Trotter (born 1987), Canadian ice hockey player
Brock Turner (born 1995), American criminal

U
Brock Ungricht (born 1984), American baseball coach

V
Brock Vandagriff (born 2002), American football player
Brock Vereen (born 1992), American football player
Brock Virtue (born 1986), Canadian curler

W
Brock Webster (born 2000), Canadian rugby union footballer
Brock Whiston (born 1996), British Paralympic swimmer
Brock Williams (born 1979), American football player
Brock Williams (screenwriter) (1894–1964), English screenwriter
Brock Winkless (1959–2015), American puppeteer
Brock Wright (born 1998), American football player

Y
Brock Yates (1933–2016), American journalist and author

Z
Brock Zeman (born 1981), Canadian singer-songwriter

See also
Brock (disambiguation), a disambiguation page for "Brock"
Brock (surname), a page for people with the surname "Brock"

English masculine given names